The 1962 Australia Cup was the first season of the Australia Cup, which was the main national association football knockout cup competition in Australia. 16 teams from around Australia entered the competition. The competition consisted of four clubs from Victoria and Sydney's competition, three from Queensland and South Australia and two from Northern New South Wales. The winner of the Australia Cup received £5,000.

The inaugural season of the Cup was won by Yugal who defeated St George Budapest 8–1 at Wentworth Park in the final. The third place playoff, between Juventus (now Brunswick Zebras from Melbourne) and Juventus (now Adelaide City), was won by the South Australian team on penalty kicks.

Teams

First round

Quarter-finals

Semi-finals

Third place play-off

Final

References

Australia Cup
Aust
Australia Cup (1962–1968) seasons